Tofane is a mountain group in the Dolomites of northern Italy, west of Cortina d'Ampezzo in the province of Belluno, Veneto. Most of the Tofane lies within Parco naturale delle Dolomiti d'Ampezzo, a nature park.

Peaks
The highest peaks of the Tofane group are Tofana di Mezzo, Tofana di Dentro, and Tofana di Rozes. Tofana di Mezzo is the third highest peak in the Dolomites, after Marmolada and Antelao. All three peaks were first climbed by Paul Grohmann along with local mountain guides, in 1863 (Tofana di Mezzo - with Francesco Lacedelli), 1864 (Tofana di Rozes - with Francesco Lacedelli, Angelo Dimai and Santo Siorpaes) and 1865 (Tofana di Dentro - with Angelo Dimai).

Geology
The Dolomites were formed during the Cretaceous Period, approximately 60 million years ago, due to the collision of the African and European continents. The Tofane is largely formed from the Upper Triassic rock Dolomia principale. The strata are perceptibly folded, and the mountains are finally formed by wind, rain, glaciers and rivers.

Tourism

Access
A cable lift system (Freccia nel Cielo, "Arrow in the sky") goes from Cortina almost to the top of Tofane di Mezzo. There is only a short walk from the top cable car to the summit. Alternatively the via ferratas VF Punta Anna and VF Gianna Aglio can be used to reach Tofane di Mezzo.

Cabins (rifugi)
Some of the cabins in the Tofane are the Rifugio Angelo Dibona, the Rifugio Giussani, the Rifugio Duca d'Aosta, and the Rifugio Pomedes.

Via ferratas
The via ferratas of Tofane are VF Punta Anna and VF Gianna Aglio on Tofana di Mezzo, VF Lamon and VF Formenton on Tofana di Dentro, and VF Giovanni Lipella on Tofana di Rozes, where there also are tunnel systems from World War I.

History
During the First World War, the Tofane was a battlefield of the Italian Front for clashes between the Italian and Austro-Hungarian forces. The front lines went through the mountains.

At the 1956 Winter Olympics, Mount Tofane hosted five of the six alpine skiing events. It regularly hosts women's speed events on the World Cup circuit, and hosted the World Championships in 2021.

See also
 Golden age of alpinism
 Silver age of alpinism
 Italian front (World War I)
 White War

References

1956 Winter Olympics official report. pp. 165–79. 
 Via ferratas of the Italian Dolomites: Volume 1 [North, central and east] by John Smith and Graham Fletcher. Published in 2002 by Cicerone, UK.  .
 Cortina d'Ampezzo e Dolomiti Ampezzane. 1:25,000, Carta Topografica. Casa Editrice Tobacco.
 ''It appears in the 1981 James Bond 007 movie:"For your eyes only".

Venues of the 1956 Winter Olympics
Olympic alpine skiing venues
Mountains of Italy
Alpine three-thousanders
Dolomites
Geography of Cortina d'Ampezzo
Mountains of the Alps